Mingin Township is a township of Kale District in Sagaing Division of Burma (Myanmar). The principal town and administrative seat is Mingin (Minking).

Borders
Mingin Township is bordered by:
 Kalewa Township, to the north,
 Kyunhla Township and Taze Township of Shwebo District, to the northeast,
 Ye-U Township of Shwebo District, to the east,
 Kani Township of Monywa District, to the southeast and south,
 Gangaw Township of Gangaw District, Magway Division, to the southwest, and
 Kale (Kalemyo Township), to the west.

Towns and villages
A Htet Satha(Upper Satha),
Anauktaw,
Auk Satha,
Ayadaw,
Chauknet Zayat,
Chaungwa,
Gonnyin,
Gwedaukkaing,
Hka-u-in,
Hpayonga,
Htonban,
Htonwaing,
Inbinhla,
Ingongyi,
Kabyit,
Kawmat,
Kin-u,
Konywa,
Kyabin,
Kyauk-o,
Kyawywa,
Kyidaung,
Kyundaw,
Kyunywa,
Kywe,
Kywegya,
Laungbyit,
Laungde,
Launggyin,
Linlu,
Mahu,
Maukkadaw,
Meme,
Mingin,
Mogaung,
Moktha,
Mondin,
Myaukchun,
Myaungzin,
Myengan,
Myogon,
Myoma,
Natbuzut,
Ngananda,
Nyaunggaing,
Nyaunggon,
Ongwe Zayat,
Onhnebok,
Pangauk, 
Panset, 
Pathe,
Pathwa,
Patolon,
Paukaing,
Peikchindaw,
Petkat,
Pindin,
Pwetnyet,
Pya,
Pyathon,
Pyindaw,
Pyingaing,
Samyin,
Seiktha,
Shandaw,
Shawdaw,
Sheywa,
Sitlingyaung,
Tamaung,
Tatchaung,
Taungbyu,
Tawma,
Tegyi,
Tegyigan,
Thanbauk,
Thazi,
Thebokkya,
Theingon,
Thinbaw,
Thindaw,
Thinwin,
Thitkaungdi,
Tidalok,
Tinbet,
Tinwagyaung,
Ton,
Tongyi,
Uywa,
Winwa,
Yondaung,
Ywaba,
Zalokma, Zanabok, Zingale, Ywataw.

Notes

External links
"Mingin Google Satellite Map" map of administrative area with listing of principal settlements, from Maplandia

 
Kale District
Townships of Sagaing Region